KVCL-FM (92.1 FM, Hometown Radio) is a radio station licensed to Winnfield, Louisiana.  The station broadcasts a country music format and is owned by Baldridge-Dumas Communications, Inc.

References

External links
KVCL-FM's official website

Radio stations in Louisiana
Country radio stations in the United States